Jaan Pakk (1877 - 9 April 1948 Peningi Parish, Harju County) was an Estonian politician. He was a member of the Estonian Constituent Assembly, representing the Estonian Social Democratic Workers' Party. He was a member of the assembly since 15 November 1919. He replaced Gustav Grünvald.

References

1877 births
1948 deaths
Estonian Social Democratic Workers' Party politicians
Members of the Estonian Constituent Assembly